2012 The Cross Straits, Hong Kong & Macau Football Competition for the Youth is the 2nd edition of the football tournament held in Hong Kong. It was held from 28 September to 2 October 2012. The competition was organised for U-16 players.

Participating teams
  Hong Kong (host)
  China PR
  Macau
  Chinese Taipei

Squads

Hong Kong

 Hon. Team Manager: Mok Yiu Keung						
 Coaches: Yeung Ching Kwong, Poon Yiu Cheuk, Cheung King Wah

Results

References

2012
2012
2012–13 in Hong Kong football
2012 in Taiwanese football
2012 in Chinese football
2012 in Macau football